Basil Maclear (7 April 1881 – 24 May 1915) was an Irish rugby international. He played eleven games for Ireland between 1905 and 1907.

Personal life
Maclear was the grandson of Sir Thomas Maclear, Her Majesty's Astronomer in Cape Town, South Africa, and one of five sons of a Bedford Doctor, Major Henry Wallich Maclear. He was later sent to Fermoy in County Cork by the British Army. Like three of his brothers, Maclear was killed in action during World War I, serving as a captain with the Royal Dublin Fusiliers during the Second Battle of Ypres. His remains were not recovered and his name is recorded on the Menin Gate memorial nearby.

Career
Maclear played his first international game on 11 February 1905 against England, a game which Ireland won 17–3. He scored four tries and three conversions during his eleven international games for Ireland. In the match against New Zealand on their 1905 tour, he was captain of Munster, which ended up losing 33–0.

Maclear was one of 25 individuals inducted to the World Rugby Hall of Fame during ceremonies held at Wembley Stadium during the 2015 Rugby World Cup.

See also
 1906 All-Ireland Senior Football Championship Final
 List of international rugby union players killed in action during the First World War

References

External links

The Rugby History Society
Report of the 1905 New Zealand tour at rugby-memorabilia.co.uk

1881 births
1915 deaths
Bedfordshire cricketers
British Army personnel of World War I
British military personnel killed in World War I
English cricketers
Ireland international rugby union players
Irish rugby union players
Monkstown Football Club players
Munster Rugby players
People educated at Bedford School
Royal Dublin Fusiliers officers
Rugby union players from Portsmouth
World Rugby Hall of Fame inductees
Rugby union centres